Bambusa bambos, the giant thorny bamboo, Indian thorny bamboo, spiny bamboo, or thorny bamboo, is a species of clumping bamboo native to southern Asia (India, Bangladesh, Sri Lanka and Indochina). It is also naturalized in Seychelles, Central America, West Indies, Java, Malaysia, Maluku, and the Philippines.

Habit
It is a tall, bright-green colored spiny bamboo species, which grows in thickets consisting of a large number of heavily branched, closely growing culms. It reaches a height of 10–35 m and grows naturally in the forests of the dry zones.

Appearance
Culms are not straight, but are armed with stout, curved spines. They are bright green, becoming brownish green when drying, and the young shoots are deep purple. Branches spread out from the base. Aerial roots reach up to few nodes above. Internode length is 15–46 cm, and diameter is 3.0–20 cm. Culm walls are 2.5–5.0 cm thick. Nodes are prominent and rootstock is stout.

Culm sheaths are dark brown when mature, elongated, and cylindrical. Length of the sheath proper is 15–25 cm and 12–30 cm in width. Blade length is 4.0–12 cm. Auricles are not prominent. Upper surfaces of the sheath are covered with blackish-brown hairs. Lower surfaces of the sheath are not hairy. Sheaths fall early.

Uses
They are extensively used in many applications, mainly for making bridges and for ladders. Leaves are used for thatching.

See also
Domesticated plants and animals of Austronesia

References

Bibliography
 Fern, Ken.  "Bambusa bambos". Useful Tropical Plants. January 1, 2016.

bambos
Flora of tropical Asia
Plants described in 1753
Taxa named by Carl Linnaeus